"Tea for Two" is a 1924 song composed by Vincent Youmans, with lyrics by Irving Caesar. It was introduced in May 1924 by Phyllis Cleveland and John Barker during the Chicago pre-Broadway run of the musical No, No, Nanette. When the show finally hit Broadway on September 16, 1925, Nanette was played by Louise Groody, and her duet with Barker of "Tea for Two" was a hit. The song went on to become the biggest success of Youmans' career.

Background
Youmans had written the basic melody idea of "Tea for Two" while he was in the navy during World War I, and he used it later on as an introductory passage for a song called "Who's Who with You?" While in Chicago, Youmans developed the idea into "a song that the hero could sing to the heroine" for the musical No, No, Nanette. He soon after played his composition for Irving Caesar and insisted he write the lyrics then and there. Caesar quickly jotted down a mock-up lyric, fully intending to revise it later on. Youmans, though, loved the mock-up and convinced Caesar it was just right for the melody.

It has been proposed, with little supporting evidence, that the phrase 'Tea for Two' was originally shouted by hawkers on the streets of 18th century England who wanted to attract business by lowering the price of a pot of tea from thruppence to tuppence. While this may be the case, 'tea for two' would have been a commonplace order for a couple in 19th century English cafeterias.

Musical characteristics
"Tea for Two" has an A1-A2-A3-B form, a range of just over an octave, and a major tonality throughout. The song's original key was A major with a pivot modulation to C major during the second "A" section. It is rhythmically repetitive (as the entire song consists of eighth and quarter notes, except for a pattern of eighth, quarter, and eighth notes which briefly emerge in the second section) and has a relatively simple harmonic progression, as well as a simple yet charming melody.

Charting recordings

Adaptations and notable covers
 In 1926, Boris Fomin arranged it for inclusion in his operetta "The Career of Pierpont Blake" (Карьера Пирпойнта Блэка), with Russian lyrics by Konstantin Podrevsky, under the title "Tahiti Trot".
 In 1927, Dmitri Shostakovich arranged "Tea for Two", known in the Soviet Union as Tahiti Trot, from memory after conductor Nicolai Malko bet him he could not do it in under an hour. He completed the orchestration in 45 minutes.

The following artists covered the song: Benny Goodman (1937), Fats Waller (c. 1938–1939), Gene Krupa with Anita O'Day (c. 1942), Art Tatum, Stan Kenton with O'Day (1944–1945), Frank Sinatra and Dinah Shore (1947), Doris Day (1955), Duke Ellington, appearing on a 1999 expanded version of Ellington at Newport (1956), Bud Powell, The Genius of Bud Powell (1956), Teddy Wilson (1956), Anita O'Day, Anita O'Day at Mister Kelly's (1959).

In popular culture
 Bugs Bunny and Daffy Duck soft-shoe to “Tea for Two” in the Looney Tunes short Show Biz Bugs.
 The song features prominently in the novel La invención de Morel (1940) by Argentine writer Adolfo Bioy Casares.
 In the French–British WWII-set comedy film La Grande Vadrouille (1966) the humming of the "Tea for Two" melody is the secret code for the British bomber crew members to recognise each other in the Turkish baths at the Grand Mosque of Paris.
  Occasionally on The Tonight Show Starring Johnny Carson, if a joke bombed during his monolog, the band would play "Tea for Two" and Carson would do a short soft shoe dance, which always got a laugh from the studio audience.
  The pianist Yuja Wang will play "Tea For Two" as an encore, after, for example, playing all four Rachmaninov piano concertos at a concert.

References

1924 songs
1925 singles
1920s jazz standards
Songs from musicals
Songs with lyrics by Irving Caesar
Nat King Cole songs
Ella Fitzgerald songs
Songs with music by Vincent Youmans
Jazz compositions in A-flat major
Brunswick Records singles